Adi Ezroni  (born November 16, 1978) is an Israeli actress, model, producer, and TV host.

Media career
She was born in Israel to a Jewish family.

She served as a soldier in the Israel Defense Forces. Subsequently, Ezroni joined the Israeli children channel, Arutz HaYeladim, where she hosted its main shows until 2003. She played in the comic TV show Zbeng! as Sivan, Hapijamot as a guest star and in the movie Wild as Rananit. She also modeled for Lord Kitsch.

On Channel 10, Ezroni appeared as Shira in the drama Matay Nitnashek, with Lior Ashkenazi.

In 2010, Ezroni produced the film Holly. In that year she began appearing in the TV drama Hatufim (Hostages) as Yael Ben-Horin. In 2016, she produced All Nighter through her Spring Pictures banner.

Filmography
As producer
 Holly (2006)
 Redlight (2009)
 Kelly & Cal (2014)
 The Runaround (2016)
 Saturday Church (2017)
 The Sound of Silence (2019)
 Save Yourselves! (2020)

As director
 Redlight (2009)

See also
Television in Israel
Cinema of Israel

References

External links
 

1978 births
Living people
Israeli female models
Israeli television actresses
Israeli Jews